Neidong National Forest Recreation Area is a forest located in Xinxian Village, Wulai District, New Taipei, Taiwan.

History
The forest area was established in 1984. In August 2015, the forest was closed after it was badly hit by Typhoon Soudelor. The forest was reopened again to the public on 15 September 2018 after restoration work which costed NT$100 million.

Geology
The forest is located at the intersection area of Neidong Creek and Nanshih Creek. It spreads across an area of 1,191 hectares at an elevation of 230-800 meters above sea level. It has an annual mean temperature of 20°C. It consists of moss, lichen and greenery, as well as various animals, such as monkeys, birds, insects etc.

Transportation
The forest is accessible by bus from Taipei Main Station.

See also
 Geography of Taiwan

References

1984 establishments in Taiwan
Geography of New Taipei
National forest recreation areas in Taiwan
Tourist attractions in New Taipei